The Lapérouse class was a type of barbette cruisers of the French Navy, with wooden hull and iron beams. Armament was fifteen  M1870M guns later replaced in Primauget with quick-firing conversions. Each ship also had eight 1-pounder revolving cannons.

Sources and references 

 
Ships built in France
Cruiser classes
Ship classes of the French Navy